Canadian rock music charts (established June 11, 1995) publishes a weekly alternative rock music chart under the name Alternative 30.

RPM charts
On June 11, 1995, Canadian music magazine RPM began publishing a weekly alternative rock music chart under the name Alternative 30. The song which held the number-one spot on this first chart was "More Human than Human" by White Zombie.

The chart took a break from December 14, 1998, to April 11, 1999, and returned on April 12 under the new name Rock Report. "Free Girl Now" by Tom Petty and the Heartbreakers debuted at the top of this newly named chart. On October 25, 1999, the chart made a slight change to the name Top 30 Rock Report. The chart kept this name until it was published for the last time on November 6, 2000, due to the ceasing of the RPM magazine's publication. The charts published by RPM are archived by Library and Archives Canada.

Radio & Records charts
On April 16, 2004, the trade publication, Radio & Records partnered with Mediabase to launch five airplay charts in Canada, including a Rock chart.

NBDS charts
Currently, the only charts that record rock/alternative airplay in Canada are published by Nielsen Broadcast Data Systems.

See also
List of RPM Rock/Alternative number-one singles

References

External links
RPM Rock/Alternative archive
Canada: Active Rock on America's Music Charts
Canada: Alternative Rock on America's Music Charts
2011 - 2013 charts archive

Canadian record charts